Contia is a small genus of snakes in the family Colubridae. The genus is endemic to North America.

Etymology
The generic name, Contia, is in honor of American entomologist John Lawrence LeConte.

Species
There are two recognized species:

References

Further reading
Baird SF, Girard CF (1853). Catalogue of North American Reptiles in the Museum of the Smithsonian Institution. Part I.—Serpents. Washington, District of Columbia: Smithsonian Institution. xvi + 172 pp. (Contia, new genus, p. 110).

Contia
Snake genera
Snakes of North America
Taxa named by Spencer Fullerton Baird
Taxa named by Charles Frédéric Girard